U10 may refer to:

 U10, a previous name of the iriver clix
 German submarine U-10, one of several German U-boats with similar designations
 Line U10, an unfinished Berlin U-Bahn line